The Markey House is a historic log house in rural eastern Benton County, Arkansas.  It is located on County Road 99, southeast of Garfield.  It is a single-story T-shaped log structure, built in 1880 and moved to its present location in 1960.  It was located on land that became part of the Pea Ridge National Military Park, and was sold by the National Park Service.  It is one of the least-altered and best-preserved log buildings in the county.

The house was listed on the National Register of Historic Places in 1988.

See also
National Register of Historic Places listings in Benton County, Arkansas

References

Houses on the National Register of Historic Places in Arkansas
Houses completed in 1880
Houses in Benton County, Arkansas
National Register of Historic Places in Benton County, Arkansas
1880 establishments in Arkansas
Log buildings and structures on the National Register of Historic Places in Arkansas
Log houses in the United States
Relocated buildings and structures in Arkansas
Pea Ridge, Arkansas